Syrphoctonus is a genus of Ichneumonid wasps with many species around the world, of which more than 30 occur in Europe.

Members of this genus are parasitoids on hoverflies.

Name
The genus name is derived from Ancient Greek Syrpho- "gnat" and -ctonus "killer", referring to the host of the genus.

References
 Fauna Europaea: Taxonomy of Syrphoctonus

External links 
 Photograph of S. pacificus

Diplazontinae
Ichneumonidae genera
Taxa named by Arnold Förster